The 2004–05 Armenian Hockey League season was the fourth season of the Armenian Hockey League, the top level of ice hockey in Armenia. Four teams participated in the league, and Dinamo Yerevan won the championship.

Regular season

Playoffs

3rd place
Shirak Gyumri - Shengavit Yerevan (4-2, 2-3, 7-3)

Final
HC Dinamo Yerevan - SCA Yerevan (3-6, 4-1, 3-1, 5-2)

External links
Season on hockeyarchives.info

Armenian Hockey League
2004 in Armenian sport
2005 in Armenian sport
Armenian Hockey League seasons